Ernest Arthur John Cazaly (2 March 1886 – 3 January 1940) was an Australian rules footballer who played with St Kilda in the Victorian Football League (VFL).

Notes

External links 

1886 births
1940 deaths
Australian rules footballers from Victoria (Australia)
St Kilda Football Club players